Rajgarh Laxmangarh is one of the 200 Legislative Assembly constituencies of Rajasthan state in India. It is in Alwar district and is reserved for candidates belonging to the Scheduled Tribes. It is a segment of Alwar (Lok Sabha constituency). It came into existence in 2008 when electoral map of India was redrawn. Until then there was Rajgarh (Rajasthan Vidhan Sabha constituency) in Rajasthan assembly.

Rajgarh- Laxmangarh (ST) Assembly Constituency Area - 
1. Tehsil Rajgarh (Partly) – (I) ILRC Machari (II) ILRC Pinan (III) ILRC Reni (IV) ILRC Dhigawara (V) ILRC Rajgarh (Partly) – (i) Municipal Board Rajgarh (ii) PC Rajgarh-A (iii) PC Rajgarh (B) (iv) PC Alei 2. Tehsil Laxmangarh (Partly) – (I) ILRC Laxmangarh (II) ILRC Bichgaon (III) ILRC Mojpur

Members of Vidhan Sabha
 Before 2008 : Seat did not exist. See : Rajgarh (Rajasthan Vidhan Sabha constituency)
 2008 : Suraj Bhan Dhanka (SP)
 2013 : Golma (NPP)

Election Results

2008 Vidhan Sabha
 Suraj Bhan Dhanka (SP) : 45,002 votes  
 Johri Lal (INC) : 44,065

2013 Vidhan Sabha
 Golma (NPP) : 64,926 votes  
 Surajbhan Dhanka (SP) : 56,798

2018

See also
List of constituencies of the Rajasthan Legislative Assembly
Alwar district
 Rajgarh, Rajasthan
 Rajgarh, Madhya Pradesh

References

Alwar district
Assembly constituencies of Rajasthan